Amy Watson (born 1981) is an American ballet dancer. She joined the Royal Danish Ballet in 2000, becoming a principal dancer in 2007. In 2011, she was honoured with the prestigious Order of the Dannebrog.

Early life
Watson was born in Washington D.C.  As her father was in the military, the family were frequently on the move. While in England, she spent two years at the Royal Academy of Dance before attending a summer course with the Richmond Ballet in Virginia when she was 12. In Fredericksburg, Virginia, she attended courses with Avery Ballet. She was also taught by George Balanchine dancers in Chautauqua, N.Y., after which she studied at the Pacific Coast Ballet Company in California. When she was 15, she attended the School of American Ballet in New York.

Career
In 1998, Watson was selected to attend a three-week course given by Suzanne Farrell in Washington. She performed so well that Farrell signed her up to go on tour with her ballet company where she remained for the next two years. In July 2000, she was invited to join the Royal Danish Ballet in Copenhagen where she became a soloist in 2003 and a principal dancer in 2007.

Her leading roles have included Aurora in The Sleeping Beauty, Odette/Odile in Swan Lake, Kitri and Mercedes in Don Quixote, Teresina in Bournonville's Napoli, and Olga in Onegin. She has also performed in modernistic works such as The Cage, Chroma and Ohad Naharin's Minus 7. Her role as Anita in West Side Story Suite also required her to sing. Although her brother is a Broadway performer, she found it quite a challenge.

In early 2014, Watson became an exchange artist with the American Ballet Theatre where she debuted with Myrta in Giselle in Minneapolis.

Awards

Shortly after Queen Margrethe II had seen her dancing Swan Lake in 2011, she was honoured with the Order of the Dannebrog.

References

American ballerinas
Royal Danish Ballet principal dancers
Prima ballerinas
American expatriates in Denmark
1981 births
Living people
Knights of the Order of the Dannebrog